Tim Jonze (born 4 February 1980) is a British music journalist for NME, Vice, Dazed and Confused and The Guardian.

Jonze has reviewed a number of songs and albums, and has interviewed Jake Gyllenhaal, Lily Allen, Bill Drummond, Samantha Fox, Morrissey, Gary Lineker, Ren Harvieu, Ricky Wilson, and Ben Howard.

References

External links

Jonze's profile at The Guardian

1980 births
British male journalists
Living people
British music journalists